Ilana S. Rubel (born November 11, 1972) is a Canadian-born American politician, currently serving as a Democratic member of the Idaho House of Representatives, representing the south Boise-based District 18 since January 2014. Rubel currently serves as Minority Leader of the House of Representatives.

Education
Rubel is a graduate of Georgetown University and Harvard Law School.

Career 
Rubel ran for Idaho House Minority Leader after the then incumbent, Rep. Mat Erpelding, resigned in December 2019 to take a position with the Boise Metro Chamber of Commerce.

Rubel was appointed to the position by Gov. Butch Otter to serve the remainder of the term of Janie Ward-Engelking, who was appointed to the Idaho Senate.

Prior to joining the Idaho House of Representatives, Rubel was a partner with the law firm Fenwick & West in Boise.

References

1972 births
21st-century American politicians
21st-century American women politicians
Georgetown University alumni
Harvard Law School alumni
Idaho lawyers
Living people
Democratic Party members of the Idaho House of Representatives
Women state legislators in Idaho